The Swiss Bookbinders' and Carton' Makers' Union (SBKV) was a trade union representing bookbinders, stationers and box makers in Switzerland.

The union was founded on 9 June 1889, in Zurich, as the Swiss Bookbinders' Union, and in 1893, it joined the Swiss Trade Union Federation.  It also joined the International Federation of Bookbinders and Kindred Trades, and by 1922, it had 1,266 members.  In 1943, it adopted its final name, and by 1954, its membership had risen to 4,465.

In 1980, the SBKV merged with the Swiss Typographers' Union, to form the Union of Printing and Paper.

References

Bookbinders' trade unions
Trade unions in Switzerland
Trade unions established in 1889
Trade unions disestablished in 1980